Venus and Mars is the fourth studio album by the British–American rock band Wings, and the sixth album by Paul McCartney after the break-up of the Beatles in 1970. Released in May 1975 as the follow-up to Band on the Run, Venus and Mars continued Wings' run of commercial success and provided a springboard for a year-long worldwide tour. The album was McCartney's first post-Beatles album to be released worldwide by Capitol Records rather than Apple.

After recording Band on the Run as a three-piece with wife Linda McCartney and guitarist Denny Laine, McCartney recruited guitarist Jimmy McCulloch and drummer Geoff Britton to the band in 1974. Recording sessions for the album took place in London, New Orleans and Los Angeles in November 1974 and early 1975. During the sessions, personal tensions caused Britton to quit after six months, forcing the band to recruit American drummer Joe English to finish the album.

Preceded by the single "Listen to What the Man Said", Venus and Mars peaked at number 1 in the US, the UK and other countries around the world. It also received mostly favourable reviews from music critics but was ultimately considered inferior to its predecessor. The album was reissued with bonus tracks in 1987 on CD and in 1993 as part of The Paul McCartney Collection. It was remastered in 2014 and released as a deluxe edition with bonus tracks and unreleased material.

Background and recording 
After recording Band on the Run (1973) as a three-piece with wife Linda and guitarist Denny Laine, McCartney added Jimmy McCulloch on lead guitar and Geoff Britton on drums to the Wings line-up in 1974. Having written several new songs for the next album, McCartney decided on New Orleans, Louisiana, as the recording venue, and Wings headed there in January 1975.
Before the departure to New Orleans, Wings had recorded three songs at Abbey Road Studios in London in November 1974: "Letting Go", "Love In Song" and "Medicine Jar", all overdubbed later at Sea Saint Studios between January and February.

As soon as the sessions began, the personality clash that had been evident between McCulloch and Britton during Wings' 1974 sessions in Nashville became more pronounced, and Britton – after a six-month tenure – quit Wings, having played on only three of the new songs. A replacement, American Joe English, was quickly auditioned and hired to finish the album.

The sessions proved to be productive, not only resulting in a finished album, but also several additional songs, including two future McCartney B-sides, "Lunch Box/Odd Sox" and "My Carnival". McCartney also decided to link the album's songs together much like the Beatles had on Abbey Road to give Venus and Mars a more continuous feel.

John Lennon, often in a nostalgic mood during his "Lost Weekend" period, had told May Pang (his then girlfriend) that they would visit the McCartneys during the recording sessions for Venus and Mars, and considered writing with him again. Lennon's planned visit never happened due to his reunion with Yoko Ono.

Wings' interpretation of the theme to Crossroads, a British soap opera, was sometimes used to end the television programme in place of the regular theme tune, usually when there was a cliffhanger ending with a hint of sadness involved.

Release 

Preceded by the single "Listen to What the Man Said" in May 1975, Venus and Mars appeared two weeks later to generally favourable reviews and brisk sales. The album reached number 1 in the United States, the United Kingdom and other countries around the world (as did "Listen to What the Man Said" in the US) and sold 4 million copies worldwide. The reaction, though mainly positive, was less than what had greeted Band on the Run a year earlier.

The album cover, which Paul summed up as "a package that would be nice to get, and also something recognizable" was photographed by Linda, depicting two billiard balls in a black background, which are yellow and red to fit the colours of the planets Venus and Mars. Interior photographs of Wings were shot in the Mojave desert  to capture a group photograph in an outerworldly location. Hipgnosis did the art design, incorporating billiard balls and cues in the lettering and illustrations by George Hardie.

Two additional singles, "Letting Go" and "Venus and Mars/Rock Show", were released. Although the latter almost reached the US top ten, it did not chart at all in the UK.

In September, Wings began what would be their year-long Wings Over the World tour in the UK, with concerts in Australia, Europe, the US and Canada to follow. Songs from Venus and Mars featured heavily in the concert setlist.

The album was first issued on compact disc by Columbia Records in 1984, although early pressings were pressed in Japan by CSR Compact Disc, which was etched in the inner ring. In 1993, Venus and Mars was remastered and reissued on CD as part of "The Paul McCartney Collection" series with "Zoo Gang" (a UK television theme that was the UK B-side of "Band on the Run" in 1974), "Lunch Box/Odd Sox" (B-side of "Coming Up" in 1980) and "My Carnival" ("Spies Like Us"' B-side in 1985) as bonus tracks. In 2007, the album was reissued in digital form on iTunes with the same bonus tracks, plus the extended "party mix" of "My Carnival"; however, this version has since been replaced by the 2014 reissue.

In 2014 the album was re-issued by Hear Music/Concord Music Group as part of the fifth set of releases, alongside Wings at the Speed of Sound, in the Paul McCartney Archive Collection. It was released in multiple formats. The reissue was accompanied by the Record Store Day exclusive edition of the "Letting Go" single.

The album was also originally released in 4-channel quadraphonic. In 1996 the quadraphonic version of the album was issued on compact disc in the DTS 5.1 Music Disc format.

Track listing 
All songs written by Paul and Linda McCartney (listed as "McCartney"), except "Medicine Jar" written by Jimmy McCulloch and Colin Allen, and "Crossroads Theme" written by Tony Hatch.

Side one

 "Venus and Mars" – 1:16
 "Rock Show" – 5:35
 "Love in Song" – 3:04
 "You Gave Me the Answer" – 2:15
 "Magneto and Titanium Man" – 3:16
 "Letting Go" – 4:33

Side two

 "Venus and Mars (Reprise)" – 2:05
 "Spirits of Ancient Egypt" – 3:04
 "Medicine Jar" – 3:37
 "Call Me Back Again" – 4:57
 "Listen to What the Man Said" – 3:57
 "Treat Her Gently – Lonely Old People" – 4:21
 "Crossroads" – 1:00

Archive Collection Reissue

Standard Edition 2-CD; the original 13-track album on the first disc, plus 14 bonus tracks on a second disc.
Deluxe Edition 2-CD/1-DVD;
the original 13-track #1 album remastered at Abbey Road Studios in London;
a bonus audio disc with 14 tracks including the hit single "Junior's Farm" and rare and previously unreleased songs;
a 128-page numbered hardbound book featuring new interview with Paul McCartney, rare and previously unpublished photographs by Linda McCartney and Aubrey Powell (entitled "Nashville Diary 1975"), inserts of archive material (including a facsimile of Paul's original handwritten lyric "scroll"), expanded track-by-track annotation and full history of the album, a deck pass "Paul and Linda McCartney – Venus and Mars", a complete illustrated history of the making of Venus and Mars and a poster and a flyer "Wings in concert at Elstree";
a DVD featuring previously unreleased and exclusive content including the original TV commercial for the album (directed by Karel Reisz), footage of the band in New Orleans ("Recording My Carnival" and "Bon Voyageur") and rehearsing the songs from Venus and Mars at Elstree Studios ("Wings At Elstree");
an access to downloadable 24bit 96 kHz high-resolution audio versions of the remastered album and bonus audio tracks.
Remastered vinyl The albums will also be available on special gatefold vinyl editions (vinyl editions include a download card).
High Resolution Digital album will be made available as both standard and deluxe versions – including Mastered for iTunes and Hi-Res formats.

Disc 1
The original 13-track album.

Disc 2 – bonus tracks

All songs written by Paul and Linda McCartney except "Walking in the Park with Eloise" written by Jim McCartney and "Baby Face" written by Harry Akst and Benny Davis.

"Junior's Farm"  – 4:23
"Sally G"  – 3:40
"Walking in the Park with Eloise"  – 3:10
"Bridge on the River Suite"  – 3:11
"My Carnival"  – 3:59
"Going To New Orleans (My Carnival)" – 2:07
"Hey Diddle"  – 3:51
"Let's Love" – 2:05
"Soily"  – 3:57
"Baby Face"  – 1:43
"Lunch Box/Odd Sox"  – 3:55
"4th of July" – 3:49
"Rock Show"  – 7:09
"Letting Go"  – 3:36

Note: "Walking in the Park with Eloise" and "Bridge on the River Suite" are credited to the Country Hams.

Disc 3 – DVD
"Recording My Carnival"
"Bon Voyageur"
"Wings at Elstree"
"Venus and Mars TV Ad"

Additional download tracks available via paulmccartney.com
"Letting Go"  – 5:39
"Love My Baby"  – 1:16
"Rock Show"  – 6:31

Personnel 
Paul McCartney – vocals, bass, guitars, keyboards, piano, percussion
Linda McCartney – keyboards, backing vocals, percussion
Denny Laine – vocals, guitars, keyboards, percussion
Jimmy McCulloch – guitars, vocals, percussion
Joe English – drums, percussion
Geoff Britton – drums on "Love in Song", "Letting Go" and "Medicine Jar"
Kenneth "Afro" Williams – congas on "Rock Show"
Allen Toussaint – piano on "Rock Show"
Dave Mason – guitar on "Listen to What the Man Said"
Tom Scott – soprano saxophone on "Listen to What the Man Said"

Charts

Weekly charts

Year-end charts

Certifications and sales

References 
Footnotes

Citations

Sources

External links

1975 albums
Albums produced by Paul McCartney
Albums recorded at Sea-Saint Studios
Albums recorded at Wally Heider Studios
Albums with cover art by Hipgnosis
Capitol Records albums
Columbia Records albums
Paul McCartney and Wings albums